Michael Waters (born 21 July 1941 in Blackrock, County Cork) is a former Irish sportsperson. He played hurling with his local club Blackrock and was a member of the Cork senior inter-county team in the 1960s.

Playing career

Club
Waters played his club hurling with the famous Blackrock club in Cork city and enjoyed some success. After enjoying little success in the minor grade he joined the club's senior team in the early 1960s.  Water's won a senior county championship title with 'the Rockies' in 1961 as Avondhu were defeated in the county final.  It was his sole county championship winners' medal.

Inter-county
Waters first came to prominence on the inter-county scene as a member of the Cork senior hurling team in the early 1960s.  It was an uncharacteristic dry-spell for 'the Rebels' and their last All-Ireland success in 1954 was becoming a distant memory.

In 1966 Cork's luck changed.  It was a successful year as 'the Rebels' defeated Waterford by two goals, giving Waters a Munster winners' medal. This victory allowed Cork to advance directly to the All-Ireland final.  Kilkenny were the opponents and were installed as the red-hot favourites.  The game has gone down in Cork folklore as one of their sweetest championship victories.  Colm Sheehan scored two goals while a John O'Halloran free struck the crossbar and rebounded into the net.  Eddie Keher fought back for 'the Cats', however, at the full-time whistle Cork were the champions by 3-9 to 1-10.  It was Waters's first All-Ireland winners' medal and a first for Cork in twelve years.  He retired from inter-county hurling shortly afterwards.

References

1941 births
Living people
Blackrock National Hurling Club hurlers
UCC hurlers
Cork inter-county hurlers
All-Ireland Senior Hurling Championship winners